The Belfast suburban rail commuter network serves the metropolitan area of Greater Belfast and some of its commuter towns with three lines. The network is owned by Translink and operated by its subsidiary NI Railways.

Larne line

Stations - Belfast Great Victoria Street, City Hospital, Botanic, Lanyon Place, Yorkgate, Whiteabbey, Jordanstown, Greenisland, Trooperslane, Clipperstown, Carrickfergus, Downshire, Whitehead, Ballycarry, Magheramorne, Glynn, Larne Town, Larne Harbour.

Portadown line

Stations - Belfast Great Victoria Street, Adelaide, Balmoral, Finaghy, Dunmurry, Derriaghy, Lambeg, Hilden, Lisburn, Moira, Lurgan, Portadown.

This line has the potential to be extended from Portadown to Armagh city centre by reopening the railway line. Government Minister for the Department for Regional Development, Danny Kennedy MLA indicates railway restoration plans of the line from Portadown to Armagh.

Bangor line

Stations - Belfast Great Victoria Street, Titanic Quarter, Sydenham, Holywood, Marino, Cultra, Seahill, Helen's Bay, Carnalea, Bangor West, Bangor.

Other information

Most trains run directly from Bangor to Portadown and vice versa (stopping at all stations on the way), though some follow only the routes shown above.
The typical off-peak service on this route is 2tph (trains per hour). The last train of the day arrives in Bangor and Portadown shortly after midnight.
 Services Belfast to Whitehead are typically every 30 mins daytime and hourly evenings and weekends.  Trains extend to Larne typically every hour.
 The concept of Suburban was a Northern Ireland Railways marketing campaign in the late 1980s and early 90s when the network was divided into Suburban (near Belfast) and Intercity (beyond), leaving the odd concept of Intercity trains running between Coleraine and the seaside town of Portrush (details).  This division is no longer recognised.

See also

Metro
Translink
Northern Ireland Railways
Dublin Suburban Rail
Cork Suburban Rail
Galway Suburban Rail
Limerick Suburban Rail

References

External links
Northern Ireland Railways

Transport in Belfast
Railway lines in Northern Ireland